The Rodman Laboratories XM235 was one of the contenders for the Squad Automatic Weapon (SAW) trials in 1975-1976.

Development
The Fabrique Nationale Minimi (designated XM249), Heckler & Koch HK23 (designated XM262), and a heavy-barreled version of the M16 (designated the XM106) were used as a control group. They were supposed to be used to figure out a baseline for the SAW contenders, which were the experimental group. They were already eliminated from consideration because they were chambered for the 5.56mm NATO cartridge.

The XM235 they designed was merely a prototype and Rodman Laboratories didn't have the facilities or expertise to copy and mass produce it. When the XM235 was selected for the 5.56mm SAW trials, Maremont Corporation and Ford Aerospace and Communication bid on the rights to make an improved model rechambered in 5.56mm  designated the XM238.

Ammunition
The XM235  was chambered for the experimental 6×45mm SAW cartridge. It had a 105-grain [6.8 gram] projectile and had a muzzle velocity of 2450 feet / second [747 meters / second]. The cartridge was intermediate in size between the 5.56×45mm NATO and 7.62×51mm NATO rounds and was considered essential for the SAW concept. The current 5.56×45mm NATO tracer round was not effective in daylight conditions beyond 800 meters, the proposed effective range for the hypothetical SAW system.

The difficulty of standardizing and supplying a third cartridge, as well as the political bramble the US would have to clamber through to force its approval on their NATO allies, led to the dropping of the requirement that the SAW be chambered in 6mm. The next round of testing (1979-1980) would use weapons chambered for the 5.56mm NATO round.

Rodman Laboratories
The facility was part of the Rock Island Arsenal campus. It was named for Lt.-Col. Thomas Jackson Rodman, who helped found Rock Island Arsenal in 1865 and was its commander until his death in 1871.

The team that worked on the XM235 was headed by Curtis D. Johnson. It was composed of Lonnie D. Antwiler, Larry C. McFarland, Arthur R. Meyer, Fred J. Skahill, Doyle L. White, Keith L. Witwer, and Richard L. Wulff.

See also
Brunswick machine gun
Ford Aerospace XM234

External links
The SAWs that never WAS: Part 2, the XM-248’s forerunner, XM235
US Patent US-3999461-A: Modular lightweight squad automatic weapon system

Light machine guns
Trial and research firearms of the United States